Alla Yevgenyevna Osipenko (Russian:Алла Евгеньевна Осипенко , born 16 June 1932 in Leningrad) is a retired  Soviet ballerina. She studied at the Leningrad Choreographic School (now Vaganova Academy) in the class of Agrippina Vaganova.

Upon graduation she joined the Kirov Ballet (now the Mariinsky Ballet) in 1950, and was promoted to prima ballerina in  1954. Her repertoire included: Lilac Fairy in The Sleeping Beauty, Odette-Odile in Swan Lake, Gamzatti in La Bayadère, Waltz and Mazurka in Chopiniana, Masha in The Nutcracker, Frigia in Spartak, the Mistress of the Copper Mountain in The Stone Flower (1957), and Mekhmene-Banu in Legend of Love (1961). In 1961, while Osipenko was on tour with the Kirov Ballet in Paris, one of her main dance partners, Rudolf Nureyev defected to the west on her 29th birthday. Osipenko, who was not a Communist Party member, was under considerable suspicion by the KGB upon her return to the Soviet Union who believed she might have known about the defection ahead of time (she didn't). She had a rocky relationship with the Kirov for much of the 1960s and Osipenko left the Kirov in 1971.

From 1971 to 1973 she was a soloist of the troupe “Choreographic Miniatures” under direction of Leonid Jakobson. She also danced leading parts of classic and modern repertoire in stagings of well-known soviet ballet-masters. Osipenko then danced the work Leningrad choreographer, Boris Eifman, becoming the first star dancer to champion his work. Osipenko was married to fellow Kirov soloist John Markovsky who had also left the Kirov to work with Jakobson.

After the fall of the Soviet Union, Osipenko moved to the US in the 1990s and worked with the Hartford Ballet Company in Connecticut. She eventually returned to St. Petersburg, Russia in 2000. She also has a longtime artistic relationship with the famed Russian filmmaker Aleksandr Sokurov and has appeared in a number of his films including the award-winning international success, Russian Ark. Osipenko is currently working as a ballet coach with the Mikhailovsky Ballet in St. Petersburg.

See also
 List of Russian ballet dancers

References
 Зозулина Н. Алла Осипенко. Л.: Искусство, 1987. — 220 с., илл. (Серия «Солисты балета»).

External links

Alla Osipenko on www.ballerinagallery.com
Short biography on the website of A. Sokurov
Alla Osipenko. Dance as a way of life Exhibition in the St. Petersburg Museum of Theatre and Music
Alla Osipenko: Beauty and Subversion in Soviet Ballet by Joel Lobenthal

1932 births
Living people
Russian ballerinas
Prima ballerinas
Mariinsky Ballet dancers
20th-century Russian ballet dancers